Craig Anthony Loston, Jr. (born December 21, 1989) is a former American football safety. He played college football at LSU, and signed with the Jaguars as an undrafted free agent in 2014.

Early years
Loston attended Eisenhower High School in Houston, Texas, where he was a four-sport star in football, basketball, track and baseball. In track & field, he was timed at 10.4 seconds in the 100-meter dash.

Regarded as a five-star recruit, Loston was ranked as the best safety in the country by Rivals.com.

College career
Loston played in two games as a true freshman in 2009 before suffering an injury and being redshirted. After spending 2010 and 2011 as a backup, he became a starter for the first time in 2012. He finished the season with 55 tackles and three interceptions. He nearly declared for the 2013 NFL Draft, but returned for his senior season at LSU.

Professional career

2014 NFL Combine

Jacksonville Jaguars 
Following the 2014 NFL Draft, Loston was signed by the Jacksonville Jaguars as an undrafted free agent. The Jaguars released Loston on August 29, 2014. However, he was signed to the practice squad on August 31, 2014.

Loston was promoted to the active roster on September 13, 2014.  He was released on September 20 and re-signed to the practice squad on September 22.  He was once again elevated to the active roster on September 29.

He was released on September 5, 2015. He was signed to the practice squad on September 6, 2015. On October 14, 2015, he was released. On October 20, 2015, Loston was signed to the practice squad, but was released one day later. On October 27, 2015, he was re-signed to the practice squad. On November 18, 2015, Loston was promoted to the active roster.

References

External links
Jacksonville Jaguars bio
LSU Tigers bio

1989 births
Living people
Players of American football from Houston
American football safeties
LSU Tigers football players
Jacksonville Jaguars players